Shura Taft is an English-born Australian television and radio presenter, based in Melbourne.

Television roles
Shura was the co-host of the children's television show Kids' WB from 2006 until 2011 on the Nine Network. He also hosted the children's game show Pyramid from 2009 to 2012.

Taft has also presented stories for the travel series Postcards and he was also a radio presenter on Nova 100. He was a contestant on Celebrity Singing Bee in 2008 and also played in the 2010 EJ Whitten Legends Game for Victoria, wearing number 9.

In 2011, Shura became the male host of the music show Eclipse Music TV on Go! and in 2012, the host of The Supercoach Show on Fox Footy.

In 2013, he was the host of the sixth season of the Australian version of The Mole. He also filled in for Larry Emdur once on The Morning Show later in the year.

In 2014, Taft joined Weekend Breakfast on the Hit Network as anchor and Triple M Melbourne as a casual radio presenter.

In 2017, Taft joined the Seven Network for their coverage of the Australian Open in Melbourne. He regularly appeared in the crowd to interview spectators in between matches and helped to build atmosphere just prior to the players entering the stadium.

Miscellaneous
Taft supports the Hawthorn Football Club, and has played amateur football for Collegians in the Victorian Amateur Football Association, winning premier division premierships with the club in 2011 and 2012.

References

External links 
 
 

1982 births
Australian game show hosts
Australian radio personalities
English emigrants to Australia
Collegians Football Club players
Living people
Australian rules footballers from Victoria (Australia)